Gabriel Bach (13 March 1927 – 18 February 2022) was a German-born Israeli jurist, who was a judge of the Supreme Court of Israel and was the deputy prosecutor in the prosecution of Adolf Eichmann.

Biography
Bach was born in Halberstadt, Saxony, Prussia, Germany, on 13 March 1927. He was the son of Victor Bach, who was the general manager of the Hirsch copper and brass factory, and his wife Erna (née Benscher) Bach. He grew up in Berlin-Charlottenburg, Brandenburg, and attended Theodor Herzl School.

In October 1938 the Bach family emigrated from Nazi Germany to Amsterdam, where he continued to attend school. He was the only survivor of his Jewish classmates from this school. In 1940, a month before the invasion of the Netherlands by the German army, the family booked a passage to Mandatory Palestine and settled in Jerusalem. He joined the Haganah in 1943 and attended high school at the Hebrew University Secondary School, graduating in 1945.

After a year of studies at the Hebrew University of Jerusalem, he received a scholarship to study law at University College London. After graduating with honors in 1949, he interned in a law office before returning to Israel, where he did military service in the Israel Defense Forces in the Military Advocate General's Corps from 1951 to 1953, and was discharged from active service with the rank of captain. In his military reserve duty he served as a judge on the Military Court of Appeals, reaching the rank of colonel.

In 1953 Bach began working in the State Attorney's Office. In 1961 he was appointed Deputy Attorney General and as the second of the three prosecutors in the Eichmann trial.

In 1969, he was appointed State Attorney. In 1982 he was appointed a judge of the Supreme Court of Israel and retired in 1997. In 1984 he served as the precedent-breaking Chairman of the Central Elections Committee. He was subsequently appointed the chairman of several senior government committees and fact finding commissions.

He subsequently represented Israel at international conferences.

Bach married Ruth Arazi, the daughter of Yehuda Arazi, in 1955. The couple lived in Jerusalem. He died on 18 February 2022, at the age of 94.

Awards
1949: Buchman Prize
Commander's Cross of the Order of Merit of the Federal Republic of Germany (10 October 1997)
Friend of Jerusalem
Honorary Member of the University of London
Lemkin Award, Los Angeles (2011)
Jülich Society Prize for Tolerance (2014)
Mensch International Foundation awarded to him as "Mensch" (2014)

Headings
Genocide trials in Israel, in: Herbert Reginbogin and Christoph Safferling (eds.):  The Nuremberg Trials. International criminal law since 1945. International Conference on the 60th Anniversary - The Nuremberg Trials : International Criminal Law Since 1945. 60th Anniversary International Conference.  KG Saur, Munich 2005  Bilingual. Post: pp. 216–223, in English, German summary

Movie
Gabriel Bach, The Prosecutor and the Eichmann trial by Wolfgang Schoen and Frank Gutermuth, TV Schoen film D 2010 TV Schoen Movie

Literature
Peter Kasza : Purified he gave himself only from the gallows Süddeutsche Zeitung of 27 January 2007

References

External links

Biographical sketch by Gabriel Bach with photos
Bach Committee (Advisory Committee on Senior Civil Service Appointments)
interview with Eichmann prosecutor Gabriel Bach (wdr.de 28 September 2010)
"With a kick an SS man was transported from Germany", interview with Gabriel Bach in the weekly Jungle World, Jungle Supplement, part 1: No 14 of 7 April 2011 Part 2: No. 15
"50 Years of the Eichmann trial - A person with murderous instincts", interview with Gabriel Bach, Spiegel Online, 11 April 2011.
Interview (2011):  My father had the sixth sense
Deputy Prosecutor in the trial of Adolf Eichmann : An interview with Gabriel Bach (haGalil.com 2007)

1927 births
2022 deaths
Adolf Eichmann
Alumni of University College London
Jewish emigrants from Nazi Germany to the Netherlands
Israeli jurists
Jewish emigrants from Nazi Germany to Mandatory Palestine
Israeli people of German-Jewish descent
Judges of the Supreme Court of Israel
People from Halberstadt
Commanders Crosses of the Order of Merit of the Federal Republic of Germany
State Attorneys of Israel